Ateny Wek Ateny is a South Sudanese journalist and lawyer who worked as Salva Kiir Mayardit's press secretary from 2013 to 2022.

Career 
Prior to his government role, he worked as a lawyer, and as a journalist and columnist for The Citizen Daily newspaper.

Ateny was worked as the press secretary for South Sudanese president Salva Kiir Mayardit from November 2013, until being fired in 2022. He was the third Press Secretary in the Office of the President and the longest serving one. Prior to his appointment, Ateny was known for his public criticism of President Kiir's administration. Ateny's appointment was described by many advocates and political analysts as an attempt to silence the critics from derailing the image of the South Sudan's political leaders. On his second international trip with the president, Ateny clashed with Kiir, refusing to leave a meeting with the president of Uganda. Ateny's relationship with Kiir was strained after the Uganda trip and he worked in isolation, and in tension with the other staff at Office of the President, without access to senior officials.

References

Year of birth missing (living people)
Living people
South Sudanese journalists
South Sudanese lawyers